Ivo Minář is the defending champion.
Martin Kližan won the title after defeating Filippo Volandri 6–3, 6–2 in the final.

Seeds

Draw

Finals

Top half

Bottom half

References
 Main draw
 Qualifying draw

]

2012 Singles
Rabat,Singles